Horst Bergmann (24 November 1937 – 10 September 2016) was a German wrestler. He competed in the men's freestyle lightweight at the 1960 Summer Olympics.

References

External links
 

1937 births
2016 deaths
German male sport wrestlers
Olympic wrestlers of the United Team of Germany
Wrestlers at the 1960 Summer Olympics
People from Nowa Sól